Gary Collier (born October 8, 1971) is a retired American college and professional basketball player who attended the University of Tulsa.

Collier played four seasons for the Golden Hurricane and was named the 1994 MVC player of the year.  He led the 1994 NCAA Tournament in scoring average with 31.3 points per game.

Collier was drafted by the Cleveland Cavaliers in the 2nd round of the 1994 NBA Draft; however, he never played in the NBA.  He played the 1994–95 season with the Quad City Thunder in the Continental Basketball League.  Collier then took his game in Europe.  He played his first two seasons for the Antwerp Diamond Giants.  He then joined the Basketball Club Oostende, also in Belgium.

Collier played 1998–99 for Rhöndorf of the Basketball Bundesliga (BBL). After Dragons Rhöndorf sold their license to Frankfurt, he did play the next season for Frankfurt Skyliners.  Collier then returned to Belgium, where he spent the following three seasons with Telindus Mons Hainaut.  He averaged 17.4 points for Telindus Mons in the final Korać Cup in 2002.  He played a final season in Europe with Paris Basket Racing, 2003–2004.

Following his playing career, Collier coached the boys' basketball coach at Arlington Heights High School in Fort Worth for four years leading them to the state semifinals in 2011.  Collier is currently the boys' basketball coach at Crowley High School in the Tarrant County area.

References

1971 births
Living people
African-American basketball players
American expatriate basketball people in Belgium
American expatriate basketball people in France
American expatriate basketball people in Germany
American men's basketball players
Antwerp Giants players
Basketball players from Texas
BC Oostende players
Belfius Mons-Hainaut players
Cleveland Cavaliers draft picks
High school basketball coaches in Texas
Paris Racing Basket players
Shooting guards
Skyliners Frankfurt players
Sportspeople from Fort Worth, Texas
Tulsa Golden Hurricane men's basketball players
21st-century African-American sportspeople
20th-century African-American sportspeople